Live Armageddon is the first live performance on DVD by Brazilian death metal band Krisiun, released in 2006 through Century Media. It was released simultaneously with their sixth studio album, AssassiNation. The DVD, which is nearly two hours in length, contains as its main feature, a performance recorded in Polish Metalmania festival in 2004. As a bonus, the DVD features 45 minutes of a show recorded in 2004 in São Paulo, that included bands such as Ratos de Porão e Korzus. The video also has two songs recorded in an amateur way at Wacken Open Air festival in 2001, footage from the Works of Carnage recording sessions, and the music video of "Murderer".

Track listing 

Metalmania 2004
"Hatred Inherit"
"Thorns of Heaven"
"Dawn of Flagellation"
"Murderer"
"Ethereal World"
"Vengeance's Revelation"
"Wolfen Tyranny"
"Conquerors of Armageddon"
"Kings of Killing"

Live in São Paulo 2004
"Dawn of Flagellation"
"Murderer"
"Ethereal World"
"Soul Devourer"
"Vengeance's Revelation"
"Ageless Venomous"
"Drum Solo"
"Wolfen Tyranny"
"Conquerors of Armageddon"
"In League with Satan"
"Works of Carnage"
"Apocalyptic Victory"

Bootlegged at Wacken 2001
"Conquerors of Armageddon"
"Drum Solo"
"Vengeance's Revelation"

Personnel 

Performers
 Alex Camargo – bass, vocals
 Moyses Kolesne – guitar
 Max Kolesne – drums

Production
 Piotr Wolański – vision mix
 Artur Wojewoda – vision edit
 Waldemar Szwajda – vision edit
 Piotr Brzeziński – sound recording, sound mix
 Robert Nowak – assistant
 Marcin Pietuch – stage design
 Jarosław Kaczmarek – stage manager
 Grzegorz Styŀa – TV producer
 Edward Gryszczyk – TV manager
 Natalia Mrózek – assistant
 Marcin Lesiecki – assistant
 Tomasz Dziubiński – executive producer
 Justyna Szarkowska – assistant

References

External links
 [ Live Armageddon] at AllMusic

Krisiun albums
2006 live albums
2006 video albums
Live video albums
Century Media Records live albums
Century Media Records video albums